Wassa-Fiase-Mpohor District is a former district council that was located in Western Region, Ghana. Originally created as an district council in 1975. However, on 1988, it was split off into two new district assemblies: Wassa West District (capital: Tarkwa) and Mpohor/Wassa East District (capital: Daboase). The district council was located in the eastern part of Western Region and had Tarkwa as its capital town.

References

Districts of the Western Region (Ghana)